Daneshnameh-ye Alai ( is an 11th-century Persian treatise by Avicenna.

Title
Daneshnameh means book of science in Persian language and Alai refers to the name of the Kakuyid ruler Ala al-Dawla Muhammad who supported the writing. The book is also known as "Ḥikmat-e 'Alā'ī".

Topic
Daneshnameh-ye Alai is a comprehensive treatise on seven sciences grouped in four sections: logic, metaphysics, natural science and mathematics. 
The original section on mathematics was lost in Avicenna's lifetime.

Translation
Daneshnameh-ye Alai was translated into Arabic language under the title "Maqāṣed al-falāsefa" by Mohammad Gazali in 1111, into French by M. Achena and H. Massé, under the title "Le livre de science", 2 vols., 1955–58 and into English by P. Morewedge, entitled "The Metaphysica of Avicenna: A Critical Translation-Commentary and Analysis of the Fundamental Arguments in Avicenna’s Metaphysica in the Dānish Nāma-i ʿAlāʾī" in 1973.

References

External links
 Digital version of Ḥekmat-e 'Alā'ī (archive.org)
 The Metaphysica of Avicenna (Ibn Sina): A Critical Translation-Commentary and Analysis of the Fundamental Arguments in Avicenna's Metaphysica in the Danish Nama-I Ala I (The Book of Scientific Knowledge)
Persian literature
Scientific works of the medieval Islamic world
Metaphysics literature
Works by Avicenna